Meeker Run is a tributary of Heberly Run in Sullivan County, Pennsylvania, in the United States. The stream has a low pH, although that could potentially be remedied. The main rock formations in the area are the Huntley Mountain Formation and the Burgoon Sandstone. The main soil associations in the vicinity of the stream are the Deep-Wellsboro-Oquaga association, the Wellsboro association, the Norwich association, and the Oquaga association.

Course
Meeker Run begins on a plateau in Davidson Township. It flows south for a short distance before turning east and flowing into a valley. Along the way, it receives an unnamed tributary. At the end of the valley, it reaches its confluence with Heberly Run.

Tributaries
Meeker Run has an unnamed tributary known as Unt 28006.

Hydrology
Meeker Run has a discharge of 320 gallons per minute during average flow conditions. The pH of the stream during average flow conditions is 4.37 and the concentration of aluminum is 0.260 milligrams per liter. It experiences chronic acidification.

The water quality of Meeker Run is considered to be "severe" (a rating worse than "very poor") in both average and high flow conditions. However, the stream only significantly affects the water quality of Heberly Run during high flow conditions.

Proposed methods of adding alkalinity to the stream include forest surface liming, as this is the only feasible method, given the difficulty of accessing the stream.

The concentration of dissolved organic carbon near the headwaters of Meeker Run is 15.0 milligrams per liter. This is nearly twice as high as any other studied stream in the watershed of East Branch Fishing Creek.

Geography and geology

The lower reaches of Meeker Run are on rock of the Huntley Mountain Formation and the upper reaches are on Burgoon Sandstone. Below its unnamed tributary, the stream flows over soil of the Deep-Wellsboro-Oquaga soil association. Upstream of this confluence, it flows over such soil associations as the Wellsboro association, the Oquaga association, and the Norwich association. Another minor soil association is found near its headwaters. Most of the soil in the watershed is strongly acidic.

Watershed

Wetlands such as marshes and fens are located in the upper reaches of the Meeker Run watershed. There is a tannic bog on a tributary of the stream.

Meeker Run can only be accessed using a four wheel drive.

History
The restoration of Meeker Run is part of the first phase of the East Branch Fishing Creek Restoration Plan. This phase, which also includes Heberly Run, is estimated to cost $230,000.

Meeker Run was first listed as an impaired stream in 2002. As of December 2011 total maximum daily load is scheduled for it in 2015.

Biology
The macroinvertebrate community of Meeker Run is considered to be the worst of several streams in the watershed of East Branch Fishing Creek.

See also
List of tributaries of Fishing Creek (North Branch Susquehanna River)
Quinn Run

References

Rivers of Sullivan County, Pennsylvania
Tributaries of Fishing Creek (North Branch Susquehanna River)
Rivers of Pennsylvania